"I Want a Guy" is a song written by Freddie Gorman, Berry Gordy and Brian Holland and was the debuting single for Motown girl group The Supremes in 1961. It was also recorded by The Marvelettes on their album Please Mr. Postman. Featuring Diana Ross in lead, the song was a doo-wop ballad similar to what the Supremes had been recording since forming as "The Primettes" two years earlier.

The song's lyrics tell about a lonely woman who wants a new lover who won't mistreat her and always be loyal to her.
I want a guy to love me
One who will love me completely
Not like the last
Who's in the past
Who broke my heart and made me cry

When issued, the song failed to chart forcing Berry Gordy to find other options for the teenage quartet - its full lineup included Barbara Martin alongside Ross, Florence Ballard and Mary Wilson. Three members of the group (Ross, Wilson and Ballard), in fact, had already recorded a single, "Tears of Sorrow"/"Pretty Baby", in their previous quartet, "The Primettes". In between the two singles the teenaged girls would replace Betty McGlown with Martin, and the new quartet would be recording under a new name (and under a new record deal). This song would be issued as a b-side of a Marvelettes hit ("Twistin' Postman") later that year and would be led by Wanda Rogers, one of her first with the group. Their version, more up-tempo than the original, also would not chart nationally, but became a regional hit.

Personnel

The Supremes version
Lead vocals by Diana Ross
Background vocals by Florence Ballard, Mary Wilson and Barbara Martin
Musitron & Ondioline instrumentation by Raynoma Liles Gordy
Other instrumentation by the Funk Brothers
Additional keyboards by Joe Hunter
Bass by James Jamerson
Drums by Benny Benjamin
Flute by Thomas "Beans" Bowles 
Guitar by Eddie Willis and Joe Messina

The Marvelettes version
Lead vocals by Wanda Young Rogers
Background vocals by Gladys Horton, Georgeanna Tillman, Wyanetta "Juanita" Cowart, and Katherine Anderson
Musitron & Ondioline instrumentation by Raynoma Liles Gordy
Other instrumentation by the Funk Brothers
Bass by James Jamerson
Drums by Benny Benjamin 
Guitar by Eddie Willis 
Organ by Richard "Popcorn" Wylie
Piano by Marvin Gaye
Tenor saxophone by Hank Cosby
Baritone saxophone by Andrew "Mike" Terry

References

1961 debut singles
The Supremes songs
The Marvelettes songs
Songs written by Berry Gordy
Songs written by Brian Holland
Songs written by Freddie Gorman
Tamla Records singles
Song recordings produced by Berry Gordy
1961 songs